Characterization is representation of a character in a narrative or dramatic work of art.

Characterization or characterisation may also refer to:

 Characterisation (law), a procedure to resolve a lawsuit 
 Characterization (materials science), the use of external techniques to probe into the internal structure and properties of a material
 Characterization (mathematics), a concept in mathematics